Bielby is a surname. Notable people with the surname include:

Elizabeth Bielby, British physician and missionary
Jonathan Bielby (born 1944), British organist
Matt Bielby (born 1965), British magazine editor
Paul Bielby (born 1956), British footballer
Richard Bielby (born 1947), British cricketer
William T. Bielby, American sociologist